Kent County (2016 population 30,475) is located in east-central New Brunswick, Canada. The county features a unique blend of cultures including Mi'kmaq, Acadian, and English. Some larger tourist attractions include the dune de Bouctouche, Kouchibouguac National Park, and Bonar Law Commons.

Federally, it is split between the ridings of Beauséjour, represented by Dominic LeBlanc of the Liberal Party of Canada and Miramichi—Grand Lake, represented by Jake Stewart of the Conservative Party of Canada. Provincially, it is split between the electoral districts of Kent North and Kent South.

History
Established in 1826 from Northumberland County: named for Prince Edward, Duke of Kent and Strathearn (1767–1820) and the father of Queen Victoria.

Census subdivisions

Communities
There are five municipalities within Kent County (listed by 2016 population):

First Nations
There are three First Nations reserves in Kent County (listed by 2016 population):

Note – Richibucto 15, formerly Big Cove Band is now called Elsipogtog First Nation

Parishes
The county is subdivided into twelve parishes (listed by 2016 population):

Demographics

Language

Access routes
Highways and numbered routes that run through the county, including external routes that start or finish at the county limits:

Highways

Principal Routes

Secondary Routes:

Secondary Routes:

External Routes:
None

Protected areas and attractions

Notable people

See also
List of communities in New Brunswick

References

 
Counties of New Brunswick